Bed and breakfast (typically shortened to B&B or BnB) is a small lodging establishment that offers overnight accommodation and breakfast. Bed and breakfasts are often private family homes and typically have between four and eleven rooms, with six being the average. In addition, a B&B usually has the hosts living in the house.

Bed and breakfast is also used to describe the level of catering included in a hotel's room prices, as opposed to room only, half-board or full-board.

International differences

China
In China, expatriates have remodelled traditional structures in quiet picturesque rural areas and opened a few rustic boutique hotels with minimum amenities. Most patrons are foreign tourists but they are growing in popularity among Chinese domestic tourists.

India
In India, the government is promoting the concept of bed & breakfast. The government is doing this to increase tourism, especially keeping in view of the demand for hotels during the 2010 Commonwealth Games in Delhi. They have classified B&Bs in 2 categories – Gold B&Bs, and Silver B&Bs. All B&Bs must be approved by the Ministry of Tourism, who will then categorize it as Gold or Silver based upon a list of pre-defined criteria.

Israel

The Israeli B&B is known as a zimmer (German for 'room'). All over the country, but especially in northern Israel (Galilee, Upper Galilee and the Golan Heights) the zimmer has developed into an extensive industry. This industry began to develop in the 1990s, when agriculture became less profitable, and many families with farms in moshavim, kibbutzim, farms and even in cities decided to try their luck in the business of hospitality. In the last decade, there has been development of bed and breakfasts also in southern Israel in the Negev.

Italy
In Italy, regional law regulates B&Bs. There is a national law "Legge 29 marzo 2001, n. 135" but each region maintains a specific regulation. Each region can adopt different regulations but they must observe the national law on Tourism (Law N° 135 /2001).

United Kingdom

There are numerous B&Bs found in seaside towns, the countryside as well as city centres.

B&Bs are graded by VisitBritain and the AA on a star system. 3, 4 and 5-star establishments have a higher standard. A majority of B&Bs in the UK have en-suite facilities.

United States

There are approximately 17,000 B&Bs in the United States.

Studies

Tourism Queensland study
In January 2003 Tourism Queensland conducted a review of current research to gain a better understanding of the Bed & Breakfast (B&B) market:

Michigan State University study
According to a study by Michigan State University:

 

According to this study, many bed and breakfast visitors make use of evaluations, given by other guests. This system of independent reviews is one of the fastest growing consumer content oriented sites on the net.

ComScore study
Another study suggests that people trust online reviews posted by previous guests:

Journal of Travel Research study
A study by the Journal of Travel Research stated:

Prince Edward Island study
A 2007 study on Prince Edward Island

Time magazine
According to Time magazine:

See also

 Airbnb

References

 
Hotel types